Aliyar Aghayev (born 17 October 1987) is an Azerbaijani football referee who officiates in the Azerbaijan Premier League. He has been a FIFA referee since 2013, and is ranked as a UEFA first category referee.

Refereeing career
He refereed at 2015–16, 2016–17, 2017–18, 2018–19, 2019–20, 2020–21, 2021–22, 2022–23 UEFA Europa League group stage.

Aghayev officiated the 2016 UEFA European Under-19 Championship Final match of France vs. Italy at Rhein-Neckar-Arena in Sinsheim, Germany on 24 July 2016.

On 2 November 2022, Aghayev officiated his first UEFA Champions League group stage match between Copenhagen and Borussia Dortmund, becoming the first referee from Azerbaijan to officiate a UEFA Champions League match.

References

External links
 
 

1987 births
Living people
Azerbaijani football referees
UEFA Champions League referees
UEFA Europa League referees
Sportspeople from Baku